All of the current stops of Blackpool Tramway are listed here, as well as past and future stops.

Main service stops

The following is a list of stops with platforms currently served by Blackpool's Bombardier Flexity 2 fleet, from north to south:

Heritage tram stops

Blackpool's heritage trams do not serve the main service platforms, instead having separate designated stops. The following is a list of stops used by them, from north to south:

Fleetwood Ferry
At Pharos Lighthouse.
Cleveleys
Bispham
Cabin
North Pier
On a track siding.
Pleasure Beach
On a track loop.

Starr Gate is also used as a temporary stop during special events.

Former stops

Stops removed by tramway upgrade
The following is a list of stops removed in 2011-2012 during the tramway modernisation, from north to south:
Pharos Street
Church Street
Preston Street
Lingfield Road
Southfleet Avenue
Westbourne Road
Westmorland Avenue
Beach Road
Lauderdale Avenue
Melton Place
Norkeed Road
Leyburn Avenue
Madison Avenue
Miner's Home
St Stephen's Avenue
Warley Road
Imperial Hotel
Cocker Street
Victoria Street (Blackpool)
Foxhall Square
Lytham Road
On the section of track leading to Rigby Road depot.
Barton Avenue
Alexandra Road
Star Hotel
Harrowside
Abercorn Place

Future stops

North Station extension

See also
Blackpool Tramway

References

External links
Blackpool Transport - The New Tramway

Transport in Blackpool
Tram transport in England